Akshaya Abov is a residential-cum-commercial skyscraper in the neighbourhood of Padur in Chennai, India. The tower is 38 stories tall, with 31 residential units and 32 swimming pools. The tower is said to be the first building in the city to house one house per floor and the only building to have 31 homes with 32 swimming pools.

History
The project was launched in October 2012 and construction began the same year. As of July 2019, 25 levels (of 38 levels) have been completed.

Location
The tower is located on a plot of 1.66 acres in Padur, a southern neighbourhood of Chennai, on the Old Mahabalipuram Road.

The tower
The ground floor (Level 1) consists of the lobby and Levels 2 and 3 will have retail and commercial spaces, respectively. Levels 4 to 31 and Levels 35 and 36 will have residential condominiums, one per floor, besides a clubhouse on Level 34. Levels 37 and 38 are service floors. The tower has a total of 31 apartments, each with its own plunge pool, besides a common swimming pool.

The tower also includes a restaurant, spa, clubhouse, private movie hall, and a business centre. The tower covers about 9 percent of the plot, with the remaining 1.5 acres used for landscaping.

See also

 List of tallest buildings in Chennai

References

Skyscraper residential buildings in Chennai